The following is a list of events relating to television in Ireland from 1993.

Events
9 January – Three days after its premiere on British television, the hit BBC children's animated television series The Animals of Farthing Wood begins on RTÉ. It  starts off with the series translated into an Irish language titled Cairde Na Coille and airing on RTÉ 1. It is still being shown on Irish television to this very day.
12 January – Charlie McCreevy is appointed Minister for Tourism, Transport and Communications with responsibility for broadcasting.
21 January – Michael D. Higgins is appointed Minister for Arts, Culture and the Gaeltacht with responsibility for broadcasting.
15 May – Ireland hosts and wins the Eurovision Song Contest. The event is presented by Fionnuala Sweeney from Millstreet, County Cork, while the winning performance is given by Niamh Kavanagh with the Jimmy Walsh composition In Your Eyes.
6 June – The hit BBC children's animated television series The Animals of Farthing Wood begins airing on Irish television screens in English for the very first time ever on RTÉ 1.
30 June – The Broadcasting Authority (Amendment) Act 1993 comes into law. The legislation concerns the production of independent television programmes.
25 September – Mary Mulcahy presents a brand new Saturday morning wrapper programme for children called Our House. Screening on Network 2 it plays programmes including the Irish dubbed version of The Animals of Farthing Wood, a new series of the puppet series The Rimini Riddle and for the very first time ever on Irish television the renowned 1960s puppetry television series Gerry Anderson's Captain Scarlet and the Mysterons (It had previously only been available to those who could receive UTV or HTV Wales).
16 December – Postman Pat returns to air on Irish television for a second time on Network 2 and continues to run until 10 March 1994.
Undated – RTÉ establishes an Independent Production Unit as part of its response to the Broadcasting Authority (Amendment) Act.

Debuts

RTÉ 1
9 January –  The Animals of Farthing Wood (1993–1995)
18 June – Lifelines (1993–1996)
30 September – Art Attacks (1993)
2 October – Ryantown (1993–1994)
24 October – Nationwide (1993–present)
3 November – Extra! Extra! Read All About It! (1993)
29 December –  Prince Cinders (1993)

Network 2
4 January –  Timberwood Tales (1991)
4 January –  Batman: The Animated Series (1992–1995)
26 January –  Toucan Tecs (1991–1992)
16 February –  Halfway Across the Galaxy and Turn Left (1994–1995)
5 April –  Taz-Mania (1991–1995)
12 April –  The Bear's Island (1992)
15 April –  Ramona (1988)
15 April –  Funnybones (1992)
17 April –  A Bunch of Munsch (1991–1992)
21 April –  Dirty Rat Tales (1990)
13 May –  The Legend of White Fang (1992–1994)
13 May –  Madeline in London (1991)
14 June –  Rosie and Jim (1990–2000)
5 July –  The Adventures of Tintin (1991–1993)
9 July –  Kideo (1993–1994)
September – The End (1993–1995)
13 September –  Baby Bollies (1993–1994)
15 September –  Juniper Jungle (1992–1993)
16 September –  The Brollys (1990)
24 September –  The New Adventures of Shoe People (1992)
25 September –  Captain Scarlet and the Mysterons (1967–1968)
25 September – Our House (1993–1994)
7 October – The Movie Show (1993–2001)
22 October –  Sandokan (1992)
23 November –  Back to the Future (1991–1992)
6 December –  Brum (1991–1994, 2001–2002)
25 December –  A Cosmic Christmas (1977)
31 December –  Sesame Street Celebrates Around the World (1993)
Undated – No Disco (1993–2003)
Undated - Melrose Place (1992-1999)
Undated - Forever Knight (1992-1996)

UTV
4 January – UTV Live (1993–present)

Changes of network affiliation

Ongoing television programmes

1960s
RTÉ News: Nine O'Clock (1961–present)
RTÉ News: Six One (1962–present)
The Late Late Show (1962–present)

1970s
Sports Stadium (1973–1997)
The Late Late Toy Show (1975–present)
RTÉ News on Two (1978–2014)
Bosco (1979–1996)
The Sunday Game (1979–present)

1980s
Mailbag (1982–1996)
Glenroe (1983–2001)
Live at 3 (1986–1997)
Saturday Live (1986–1999)
Questions and Answers (1986–2009)
Dempsey's Den (1986–2010)
Marketplace (1987–1996)
Where in the World? (1987–1996)
Know Your Sport (1987–1998)
Kenny Live (1988–1999)
Fair City (1989–present)
RTÉ News: One O'Clock (1989–present)

1990s
Would You Believe (1990s–present)
Winning Streak (1990–present)
Blackboard Jungle (1991–1997)
Challenging Times (1991–2001)
Prime Time (1992–present)

Ending this year
20 March – Secrets (1990–1993)
June – Jo Maxi (1988–1993)
22 December  – Extra! Extra! Read All About It! (1993)

See also
1993 in Ireland

References

 
1990s in Irish television